Mizzou Arena is an indoor arena located on the campus of the University of Missouri in Columbia, Missouri. Home to the school's men's and women's basketball teams, the facility opened in November 2004 and replaced the Hearnes Center as the school's flagship indoor sports facility. The arena also serves as the Columbia-Jefferson City market's venue for well-known 'arena' acts such as Rascal Flatts, Luke Bryan and the Eagles. The arched-roof building seats 15,061, and is located just south of Hearnes and Memorial Stadium. The arena is host to Missouri State High School Activities Association championships for basketball and wrestling. The arena was originally known as Paige Sports Arena.

About the arena

Mizzou Arena also includes offices for the Men's and Women's basketball programs, the Athletic Administration and Mizzou Arena's Building Operations.  For the basketball programs the arena also offers locker rooms, a 24-hour practice gym, weight and training facilities including a hydrotherapy pool, video classrooms with audio and video editing capabilities, and an academic study center.

Missouri basketball coach from 1967 to 1999, Norm Stewart, is the namesake of the arena's playing court.

History
After protracted negotiations, a third of the venue's $75 million cost was donated by Walmart heiress Nancy Walton Laurie and her husband Bill. It was initially named Paige Sports Arena after their daughter (who attended the University of Southern California rather than Mizzou, to much alumni and student criticism regarding the name), but the Lauries gave up their naming rights due to a term paper scandal involving that daughter shortly after the arena's dedication. The name of the arena's playing surface, Norm Stewart Court (in honor of Mizzou's longtime men's coach), was carried over from the basketball team's previous home at the Hearnes Center with the arena's opening in 2004.

Attendance at men's basketball games has dropped somewhat, commensurate with the move of Mizzou in 2012 from the Big 12 Conference to the Southeastern Conference due to weak overall conference strength in the sport. With one conference game left to play in 2014, attendance was on track to be at its lowest since the 2007–08 season.

In September 2014, the university announced renovations to the arena including new scoreboard infrastructure, improvements to the facility's entryway and upgrades to the team's locker room coming from a $1.5 million donation.

In June 2017, a former Mizzou athletics staffer was arrested on two felony charges after he allegedly drove a Volkswagen Passat through Mizzou Arena and onto Norm Stewart Court early that morning, causing an estimated $100,000 in damages.

See also
 List of NCAA Division I basketball arenas

References

External links

 Mizzou Arena Concerts at MUTigers.com
 Mizzou Arena Men's Basketball at MUTigers.com
 Mizzou Arena Women's Basketball at MUTigers.com
 Tiger Scholarship Fund

College basketball venues in the United States
Missouri Tigers basketball venues
Sports venues completed in 2004
Basketball venues in Missouri
Sports venues in Columbia, Missouri
Buildings and structures in Columbia, Missouri
2004 establishments in Missouri
Sports venues in Missouri